The North Carolina–South Carolina football rivalry is an American college football rivalry between the North Carolina Tar Heels football team of the University of North Carolina at Chapel Hill and South Carolina Gamecocks football team of the University of South Carolina. North Carolina leads the series 35–20–4 through the 2021 season. North Carolina won 29 of the first 40 games in the series; however South Carolina has led the series 13-6 since beating the Tar Heels in 1967.

Series history
The series started in 1903 with a win for North Carolina in Columbia, South Carolina. The teams met in 2021; South Carolina won 38-21 and will play in Charlotte, North Carolina in 2023 for the 60th meeting. Both schools announced a home and home series for the years 2028 and 2029. The Tar Heels will travel to Columbia, South Carolina in 2028, and The Gamecocks will play in Chapel Hill, North Carolina the following year.

Geography 
Being close geographically, both teams compete for recruits on an annual basis. North Carolina has pulled players such as Robert Quinn and Quinshad Davis out of South Carolina in recent years. South Carolina has done the same by recruiting Larenz Bryant and Connor Mitch from North Carolina. Proximity also plays a role because in some areas of the two states there are significant populations of fans for each team. For example, Charlotte, North Carolina is closer to Columbia than Chapel Hill. Location can lead to ". . .families with Gamecocks and Tar Heels split down the middle. Couples where the man bleeds Carolina Blue, and the woman is all about the Garnet and Black. The fight, when it is present, is very real."

The usage of "Carolina" 
Both North and South Carolina make use of "Carolina" as a moniker. From 1999 to 2004, North Carolina had "Carolina Tar Heels" written on its interlocking N and C logo. South Carolina uses only a "C", which is used to start the title "Carolina". The official color of UNC is "Carolina Blue", which is an officially licensed color. Both schools use end zones painted with the title "Carolina" and "Tar Heels" or "Gamecocks" across them. Both schools use the script "Carolina" on a number of their sports uniforms. Both have the moniker trademarked.

North Carolina fans argue that it was the first public university in America, and claimed the nickname first. Also, the Province of Carolina  was founded in what is modern day North Carolina.

South Carolina fans argue that South Carolina became a state first as well as the fact that the principal seat of government of the Province of Carolina was located in Charles Town, now modern day Charleston, South Carolina.

Both schools have referred to themselves as simply "Carolina", even when playing each other.

Gamecocks leave the ACC 
North Carolina and South Carolina spent 49 years in the same athletic conferences, first in the Southern Conference and later in the Atlantic Coast Conference, until the Gamecocks left the ACC to become independent in 1971. The reason for South Carolina's departure was how much control and influence UNC and the other North Carolina schools had on the ACC and Gamecock coach Frank McGuire's displeasure with conference officials who he felt were biased in favor of the "Tobacco Road" schools. Some high-profile South Carolina recruits did not meet the academic requirements to play in the ACC. Gamecock basketball player Mike Grosso never played a game with South Carolina, because Duke University questioned his academic standing.

Game results

See also  
 List of NCAA college football rivalry games

References

College football rivalries in the United States
North Carolina Tar Heels football
South Carolina Gamecocks football